Moitrelia boeticella is a species of snout moth. It is found in Spain and North Africa, including Tunisia.

The wingspan is about 20 mm.

References

Moths described in 1887
Phycitini
Lepidoptera of North Africa